The Electro-Motive Division GT22HW-2 is a custom designed EMD A1A-A1A diesel-electric locomotive built by Đuro Đaković for Yugoslavia. Mainly used for passenger service, the reliability of these locomotives made this model a success even after the breakup of Yugoslavia. Designated as the Series 645 in the Yugoslav Railways, these locomotives were later known as the Series 2044 in the Croatian Railways after 1991. Thirty four examples (645.001 - 645.034), of this model were built between February 1981 to August 1984 and were given four different lettering variations due to the various ethnicities existing in Yugoslavia at the time.

 .001 - .030 are lettered JUGOSLAVENSKE ŽELJEZNICE (Croatian)
 .031 - .032 are lettered ЈУГОСЛОВЕНСКЕ ЖЕЛЕЗНИЦE (Serbian Cyrillic)
 .033 - .034 are lettered JUGOSLOVENSKE ŽELEZNICE - HEKURUDHAT JUGOSLLAVE (Serbian/Albanian)

Due to the locomotive's unique designation, the model breaks down into several indications:

Although the locomotives are equipped with A1A-A1A running gear, no official designation was present until 1993 due to low production.

Sources

External links 

Details (in Croatian)

A1A-A1A locomotives
Đuro Đaković (company)
G22THW-2
Standard gauge locomotives of Yugoslavia
Standard gauge locomotives of Croatia
Railway locomotives introduced in 1981
Standard gauge locomotives of Serbia
Standard gauge locomotives of Slovenia
Diesel-electric locomotives of Croatia
Diesel-electric locomotives of Serbia
Diesel-electric locomotives of Yugoslavia
Diesel-electric locomotives of Slovenia